VOTD may refer to:

 Voyage of the Damned, a 1974 novel and 1976 film concerning the fate of the MS St. Louis
 "Voyage of the Damned", a 1997 episode of the fifth season of Frasier
 "Voyage of the Damned" (Doctor Who), a 2007 episode of Doctor Who featuring the Tenth Doctor
 "Victory of the Daleks", a 2010 episode of Doctor Who featuring the Eleventh Doctor